Lucas Gregorowicz (born 31 August 1976 in London) is a German-Polish actor.

Life and work 
Gregorowicz was born in London and lived there for ten years before his family moved to Bochum, where he studied at the Schauspielschule Bochum from 1996 to 2000. After a few appearances in television series like , Die Wache and Adelheid und ihre Mörder, his cinematic debut was alongside Moritz Bleibtreu in Christian Zübert's Lammbock. He also took on roles in Fatih Akin's Solino, as well as in Vivian Naefe's  and Sönke Wortmann's The Miracle of Bern. In Cattolica by Rudolph Jula, Gregorowicz plays the hedonistic Stefan, whose life is suddenly changed by his encounter with a stranger.

He continues to act in TV productions, such as the ARD series Vier gegen Z as Jona from 2004 to 2006, and on the ZDF series Sterne über Madeira. In 2013, he played in Generation War as a partisan leader where he mainly spoke Polish. Since 2015, he has been the police chief Adam Raczek in Polizeiruf 110 for Rundfunk Berlin-Brandenburg.

He is married to the German film and theater actress  and lives in Vienna. By 2016, they had planned to move to Berlin.

Theatre roles 
 1997–2005: Management at the Schauspielhaus Bochum
 2005: Management at the Schauspielhaus Zürich
 2005–2006: Management at the Theater am Kurfürstendamm, Berlin
 2007: Schauspiel Köln
 2010: Management at the Burgtheater, Vienna
 2011–2016: Engagement at the Burgtheater, Vienna

TV shows 

 1997: It Happened in Broad Daylight – Director: Nico Hofmann
 1999: Adelheid und ihre Mörder (TV series, episode Ein paar Volt zuviel)
 2000: Die Wache (TV series, episode Golden Delicious)
 2000:  (TV series, episode Amok)
 2002: SK Kölsch (TV series, episode Gefallene Engel)
 2002: 
 2003: Verrückt ist auch normal
 2003: The Miracle of Bern
 2004: Sterne über Madeira
 2004: Stubbe – Von Fall zu Fall (TV series, Tödliches Schweigen)
 2004: 
 2005–2007: Vier gegen Z (TV series, 40 episodes)
 2005: Gegen jedes Risiko
 2005: Utta Danella (TV series, Eine Liebe in Venedig)
 2005: Mutig in die neuen Zeiten – Im Reich der Reblaus 2006: The Shell Seekers (TV miniseries)
 2006: Mutig in die neuen Zeiten – Nur keine Wellen 2006: Teufelsbraten (TV series, 2 episodes)
 2006: Vater Undercover – Im Auftrag der Familie 2007: Alma ermittelt – Tango und Tod 2007: Notruf Hafenkante (TV series, Liebeswahn)
 2007: Lutter (TV series, Essen is fertig)
 2007: Lutter (TV series, Um jeden Preis)
 2007: Stolberg (TV series, Der Sonnenkönig)
 2007: Oh Tannenbaum 2008: Wir sind das Volk – Liebe kennt keine Grenzen 2009: Tatort – Schweinegeld 2009: Kein Geist für alle Fälle 2010: Liebe und andere Delikatessen 2010: KDD – Kriminaldauerdienst (TV series, 2 episodes)
 2011: Nina sieht es ...!!! 2011: The Promise (TV series, 4 episodes)
 2013: Generation War (TV series, 2 episodes)
 2014: Die Pilgerin (TV film, 2 episodes)
 2014: Schmidt – Chaos auf Rezept (TV series, 8 episodes)
 2014: Zorn – Tod und Regen 2015–2016: Vorstadtweiber (TV series, 20 episodes)
 2015: Der Kriminalist (TV series, Treu bis in den Tod)
 2015: Polizeiruf 110 – Grenzgänger 2016: Polizeiruf 110 – Der Preis der Freiheit 2016: Stralsund (TV series, Schutzlos)
 2016: Stralsund (TV series, Vergeltung)
 2019: Der Pass (TV series)

 Movies 
 2001: Lammbock 2001: Herz 2001: Solino 2002: Cattolica 2003: The Miracle of Bern 2003: Sugar Orange 2006: Goldene Zeiten 2008: Hardcover 2008: Chiko 2009: Soul Kitchen 2010:  2016:  2017: Lommbock 2017: ''

Awards 
 2003: DIVA – Deutscher Entertainment Preis

References

External links 
 
 Lucas Gregorowicz at filmportal.de
 Lucas Gregorowicz at his agencys website
 

German male film actors
Polish male film actors
1976 births
Living people
Male actors from London
People from Bochum
Polish emigrants to Germany
German male stage actors